Colonel John Birch (7 September 1615 – 10 May 1691) was an English soldier and politician from Manchester, who fought for the Parliamentarian cause in the First English Civil War, and sat in the House of Commons at various times between 1646 and 1691.

Excluded from Parliament in Pride's Purge of December 1648, he was also prevented from taking his seat for Leominster under the Protectorate. After the Stuart Restoration in 1660, he sat on over 122 Parliamentary Committees, particularly those connected with finance.

Although Presbyterian by upbringing, he voted in favour of the 1673 and 1678 Test Acts, requiring holders of public office to be members of the Church of England. He himself conformed, supported the exclusion of the Catholic James II in 1679, and backed the 1689 Glorious Revolution.

Considered a "great Parliamentarian", his contemporary Gilbert Burnet summarised him as follows; "He was the roughest and boldest speaker in the House, and talked in the language and phrases of a carrier, but with a beauty and eloquence that was always acceptable. He spoke always with much life and heat, but judgment was not his talent."

Personal details
John Birch was born 7 September 1615, second but eldest surviving son of Samuel and Mary Birch. His father was a wealthy Presbyterian merchant, who owned Ardwick Manor, outside Manchester. He had two brothers, Samuel (1621-1683), and Thomas (1633-1700). He moved to Bristol in 1633, where he set up as a wine merchant.

Birch married Alice Deane (died 1671), daughter of a Bristol merchant. They had five children who lived to adulthood; John ( – after 1683), Samuel (died 1704), Mary (ca. 1645–1728), Elizabeth and Sarah (died 1702). There were no children from his second marriage to Winifred Norris, who died in 1717.

Wars of the Three Kingdoms
  

At the start of the First English Civil War in August 1642, Birch was a captain in the Bristol militia and served with the Parliamentarian garrison. He later recorded that some of his men viewed the war as a break from routine, with better pay and rations than in civilian life and were concerned it might end too soon. After the Royalists captured the town in June 1643, the garrison was given a pass to London. With the help of Sir Arthur Haselrig, Birch was commissioned in the army commanded by William Waller, and quickly proved an energetic and courageous officer. In November 1643, he served in the first Siege of Basing House, and was slightly wounded in the Battle of Alton on 13 December. Less than a week later, he was shot in the stomach in an assault on Arundel Castle, allegedly surviving only because the cold weather stemmed the flow of blood.   

Birch recovered from his wounds in time to fight at Cheriton in March 1644, a lesser known Parliamentarian success that forced Charles I onto the defensive in South East England. At Cropredy Bridge in June, he commanded the rearguard that held the bridge long enough to allow Waller's main force to retreat. Shortly after this, Birch raised a regiment of infantry which was shipped to Plymouth to reinforce the garrison and spent the rest of the war in South West England and the Welsh Marches.

Although not part of the New Model Army, his unit took part in its 1645 Western Campaign including the capture of Bridgwater and Bristol. On 17 December 1645, Birch led a surprise night-time attack on the Royalist garrison of Hereford, which had recently repulsed a month-long siege by Scots Covenanters, and the Royalist commander Barnabas Scudamore was later accused of betrayal. Appointed Governor of Hereford, Birch also fought at Stow-on-the-Wold in March 1646, the last major battle of the war, and captured Goodrich Castle in June, just before the war ended.

However, victory resulted in increasingly bitter disputes over the post-war political settlement between radicals within the New Model like Oliver Cromwell, and the moderate party in Parliament, which included his former commander William Waller, and Denzil Holles. At the same time, Parliament's desperate economic position made reductions in the military a matter of urgency. Birch became involved in a struggle with the other regional Parliamentarian commander, Edward Harley, as both men sought to ensure their troops were the ones retained.   

Coming from one of the most prominent members of the landed gentry in Herefordshire, and one of the few families to support Parliament in 1642, Harley defeated Birch in 1646 when he stood as MP for Herefordshire. Despite this setback, in September Birch was elected for Leominster, but under the Self-denying Ordinance was required to give up his military commission. Appointed High steward of Leominster in 1648, he also invested heavily in purchasing church lands, which made him extremely wealthy. Disputes over a peace settlement with Charles I and religious policy split Parliament between moderates like Birch, and more radical religious Independents such as Oliver Cromwell, including his cousin Thomas Birch. After the Second English Civil War he was excluded from Parliament in Pride's Purge of 6 December 1648.

1660 Restoration and after

Birch met with Charles II prior to the Battle of Worcester in September 1651 but avoided direct participation, possibly due to the influence of his cousin Thomas, who remained loyal to the Protectorate. He retained his Leominster seat throughout the Commonwealth, although he was not allowed to take his seat, and later claimed to have been arrested 21 times. After the Stuart Restoration in 1660, he was removed as High Steward of Leominster, and forced to sell his lands back to the church, ending his influence in the area. However, in 1661 he was returned as MP for Penryn, in the Cavalier Parliament.

Although he never held high political office, Birch sat on numerous committees, especially those connected to public spending and taxes, where he proved a relentless and astute auditor. His presence on the committee to review naval expenditure after the Second Anglo-Dutch War brought him into contact with Pepys, who noted he "do take it upon him to defend us, and do mightily do me right in all his discourse". According to one commentator, he was "the roughest and boldest speaker in the House, who talked in the language and phrases of a carrier, but with a beauty and eloquence that was always acceptable". 

The 1662 Act of Uniformity expelled Presbyterians from the Church of England, who thus became Protestant Nonconformists. They included John, and his brother Samuel (1621-1680), who was evicted from his parish of Bampton, Oxfordshire as a result. However, Birch voted for the 1673 Test Act, which required holders of public office holders to be Anglicans, and became a member of the church. This was largely due to his opposition to Catholicism, and in the Exclusion Crisis, he supported barring Charles' Catholic brother James from the throne. 

Birch purchased Garnstone Manor, Weobly, in 1661, giving him control of its Parliamentary seat. First elected in 1679, he held it until his death in 1691, with the exception of 1685, when he stood down following the accession of James II. He regained it after the November 1688 Glorious Revolution, and was prominent in debates over the Bill of Rights and the Revolutionary settlement.

His last recorded Parliamentary appearance was in April 1690; he died at home on 10 May 1691, and was buried at St Peter and St Paul's, Weobley. The railings around his monument extended into the altar space, and were removed in 1694 by Gilbert Ironside, Bishop of Hereford; the holes are still visible. His youngest daughter, Sarah, inherited Garnstone, on condition she marry her cousin, another John Birch; he held the Weobley seat almost continuously from 1701, until his death in 1735.

Notes

References

Sources

Bibliography

External links
 John Webb.  Military memoir of John Birch
 Brief history of the Life of John Birch (up to the start of his political career)
 Biography on British Civil Wars site
 Battle of Cropredy Bridge
 House of Commons Journal for 22 December 1645 recording the arrival of news of the capture of Hereford
 References to Col Birch in The Diary of Samuel Pepys

1615 births
1691 deaths
English army officers
Members of the pre-1707 English Parliament for constituencies in Cornwall
English MPs 1640–1648
English MPs 1654–1655
English MPs 1656–1658
English MPs 1659
English MPs 1660
English MPs 1661–1679
English MPs 1679
English MPs 1680–1681
English MPs 1681
English MPs 1689–1690
English MPs 1690–1695
17th-century English military personnel
English Presbyterians of the Interregnum (England)
Parliamentarian military personnel of the English Civil War
Military personnel from Manchester